Walter Joseph "Joe" Marm Jr. (born November 20, 1941) is a retired United States Army colonel and a recipient of the United States military's highest decoration for valor, the Medal of Honor, for his actions in the Vietnam War.

Early life
Marm was born in Washington, Pennsylvania, to Walter and Dorothy Marm, a Pennsylvania State police officer and retail clerk, respectively. He graduated from Duquesne University with a business degree in 1964. He then joined the United States Army from Pittsburgh, Pennsylvania, graduated from Officers Candidate School, and attended Ranger School.

Military career
By September 1965, Marm was serving in the Republic of Vietnam (South Vietnam). On November 14, he was a second lieutenant and platoon leader of 2nd Platoon, A Company, 1st Battalion, 7th Cavalry Regiment, 1st Cavalry Division (Airmobile). On that day, during the Battle of Ia Drang, he single-handedly destroyed an enemy machine-gun position and several of its defenders, suffering severe wounds in the process. Marm survived his wounds and was subsequently promoted to first lieutenant; on December 19, 1966, he was awarded the Medal of Honor for his actions.

Marm reached the rank of colonel before retiring from the army in 1995. Marm is an Eagle Scout.
As such, he is one of only eleven known Eagle Scouts who also received the Medal of Honor.

Medal of Honor citation

First Lieutenant Marm's official Medal of Honor citation reads:

Political endorsement
Marm, a conservative Republican, endorsed Donald Trump for president in 2016. Marm traveled with Trump to election rallies and appeared on stage with him at numerous locations including Selma, North Carolina on November 3, 2016.

See also

List of Medal of Honor recipients for the Vietnam War

References

External links

Walter Marm at the Congressional Medal of Honor's channel on Vimeo

1941 births
Living people
People from Washington, Pennsylvania
United States Army personnel of the Vietnam War
United States Army Medal of Honor recipients
United States Army colonels
Vietnam War recipients of the Medal of Honor
Pennsylvania Republicans
Military personnel from Pennsylvania